Jean-Louis Guignabodet (born 28 March 1956) is a former Grand Prix motorcycle road racer from France. His best year was in 1977 when he finished in fourth place in the 125cc world championship riding for the Morbidelli factory.

References

1956 births
Living people
French motorcycle racers
125cc World Championship riders
250cc World Championship riders
350cc World Championship riders
Place of birth missing (living people)